Alfred W. Greer House is a historic home located at Poplar Bluff, Butler County, Missouri. It was built in 1915, and is a -story, rectangular plan, American Craftsman style brick dwelling with a -story side wing.  It has a gable roof with wide eaves and exposed rafters and features large brick porch piers on the main facade.

It was listed on the National Register of Historic Places in 1998. It is located in the Cynthia-Kinzer Historic District.

References

Individually listed contributing properties to historic districts on the National Register in Missouri
Houses on the National Register of Historic Places in Missouri
Bungalow architecture in Missouri
Houses completed in 1915
Houses in Butler County, Missouri
National Register of Historic Places in Butler County, Missouri